The fourth-generation Toyota Prius was first shown during September 2015 in Las Vegas, and was released for retail customers in Japan on 9 December 2015. The launch in North American market occurred in January 2016, and February in Europe. Toyota expected to sell 12,000 fourth generation Prius cars a month in Japan, and to reach annual sales between 300,000 and 350,000 units.

Overview 

The fourth-generation Prius was designed to deliver significantly improved fuel economy in a more compact package that is lighter in weight and lower in cost. These objectives were achieved through the development of a new generation of powertrains with significant advances in battery, electric motor and gasoline engine technologies. 

In August 2013, Toyota Managing Officer Satoshi Ogiso, who was chief engineer for the Prius line, announced some of the improvements and key features of the next generation Prius. The next Prius is the first vehicle to use the Toyota New Global Architecture (TNGA) modular platform, which provides a lower center of gravity and increased structural rigidity. These features, along with other improvements allow for gains in ride-and-handling, agility and aerodynamics. The improved aerodynamics contribute to an all-new exterior design, which includes a roomier interior. Ogiso also explained that the next-generation Prius plug-in hybrid, the Prius Prime, was developed in parallel with the standard Prius model.

The fourth-generation Prius is  longer,  wider and  lower; at the rear a double wishbone independent suspension replaces its predecessors' torsion beam. The front uses standard LED headlamps.

The vehicle features smaller electric motors, with higher power density than the previous Prius motors and the gasoline engine features a maximum thermal efficiency greater than 40% (that of the third-generation Prius is 38.5%).

The fourth-generation Prius also uses a 0.75 kWh lithium-ion battery pack that offers higher energy density than the 1.3 kWh nickel-metal hydride battery used in the prior generation. 

In late November 2018, for the 2019 model year, the U.S. market Prius lineup introduced an all-wheel drive model  featuring Toyota's E-Four system, that adds a motor to the rear axle. This has been available for the Japanese market Prius since 2015 and the hybrid versions of the RAV4 and Lexus NX. The AWD-e models use a 1.2 kWh nickel–metal hydride battery that performs better in areas with colder temperatures where drivers favor all-wheel drive.

Also in 2019, the trim levels were renamed from One, Two, Three and Four, to L, LE, XLE, and Limited, respectively, which put the structure in line with other Toyota models.

Efficiency 
The Prius fuel economy has improved on average by about 10% each generation, and Toyota has set the challenge to continue to improve at this rate.

Toyota also offers an "Eco" base-model variant of the fourth-generation Prius with improved efficiency, largely due to the reduced weight, achieved by eliminating the spare tire, a rear-window wiper and trunk-lid lining. The Eco variant has an official EPA rating of  city,  highway, and  combined.

The Eco variant passed the first-generation Honda Insight's  as the most fuel efficient car available in the US without plug-in capability.

Facelift 
The Prius received a facelift with redesigned headlights and tail lights, which was released in Japan on 17 December 2018.

In 2020, for the 2021 model year, Toyota USA released the 2020 Edition Prius. Based on the XLE model, differences were mostly black wheels, badges and trim and carpets with a "Prius 2020 Edition" insert.

Safety
The 2022 Prius was tested by the US IIHS:

Discontinuation 
Australia and New Zealand discontinued the Prius as well as the UK in early January 2022 

It was discontinued in New Zealand in August 2021, and at the time was reduced to the Prius Prime plug-in hybrid model, with the regular hybrid discontinued in 2020. It was discontinued due to slow sales as only 38 were sold nationally between January and July 2021.

The Prius was discontinued in Australia in May 2022 after 21 years because other Toyota hybrid models were selling well and its unique selling point had been lost.

References

5
2020s cars
Cars introduced in 2015
Front-wheel-drive vehicles
Hybrid electric cars
Hatchbacks